The Via Flaminia or Flaminian Way was an ancient Roman road leading from Rome over the Apennine Mountains to Ariminum (Rimini) on the coast of the Adriatic Sea, and due to the ruggedness of the mountains was the major option the Romans had for travel between Etruria, Latium, Campania, and the Po Valley. The section running through northern Rome is where Constantine the Great had his famous vision of the Chi Rho, leading to his conversion to Christianity and the Christianization of the Roman Empire.

Today the same route, still called by the same name for much of its distance, is paralleled or overlaid by Strada Statale (SS) 3, also called Strada Regionale (SR) 3 in Lazio and Umbria, and Strada Provinciale (SP) 3 in Marche. It leaves Rome, goes up the Val Tevere ("Valley of the Tiber") and into the mountains at Castello delle Formiche, ascends to Gualdo Tadino, continuing over the divide at Scheggia Pass,  to Cagli. From there it descends the eastern slope waterways between the Tuscan-Emilian Apennines and the Umbrian Apennines to Fano on the coast and goes north, parallel to Highway A14 to Rimini.

This route, once convenient to Roman citizens and other travelers, is now congested by heavy traffic between north Italy and the capital at Rome. It remains a country road, while the traffic crosses by railway and autostrada through dozens of tunnels between Florence and Bologna, a shorter, more direct route under the ridges and nearly inaccessible passes.

History
It was constructed by Gaius Flaminius during his censorship (220 BC). Sources mention frequent improvements being made to it during the imperial period. Augustus instituted a general restoration of the roads of Italy, assigning supervision of different regions to various senators. Triumphal arches were erected in his honour on the former bridge and at Ariminum, the latter of which is still preserved. Vespasian constructed a new tunnel through the pass of Intercisa (Furlo), in AD 77, and Trajan, as inscriptions show, repaired several bridges along the road.

During the period of Roman expansion in the 3rd and 2nd centuries BC, the Flaminia became, with the sea route, a main axis of transportation by which wheat from the Po valley supplied Rome and central Italy. 

A number of major battles were fought on or near the Via Flaminia, for example at Sentinum (near the modern Sassoferrato) and near Tadinum (the modern Gualdo Tadino). Constantine the Great's famous Battle of the Milvian Bridge also occurred on the road, after his nearby dream of the Chi Rho (which led to his conversion and that of the Roman Empire to Christianity).

In late antiquity the Via Flaminia remained Rome’s major artery both to the Adriatic and to Italy north of the Apennines. The Itinerarium Burdigalense and the Priscillianists who had been expelled from their sees both took this route to Rome despite its length. After the fall of the western Roman Empire the route remained in use, and when the Ostrogothic king Theodahad set out from Ravenna for Rome around 535, a letter of Cassiodorus mentions work done to repair the road. After the emperor Justinian invaded Italy, competition between the Goths and Romans over strongpoints on the road resulted in more activity through a route that ran slightly to the north through Perugia, the old Etruscan Via Amerina. The Lombard conquest ultimately resulted in the breaking of the Via Flaminia. In the late sixth century the Via Flaminia was severed by the establishment of the Lombard Duchy of Spoleto, with the border around contested Narni. In its place was established the ‘Byzantine corridor’, a new route linking Rome and Ravenna that departed both cities on the Via Flaminia but which was forced due to political circumstances to pass through Perugia rather than Spoleto.

In the Middle Ages it was known as the Ravenna road, as it led to the then more important city of Ravenna. Following the end of the Exarchate of Ravenna, it fell into disuse during the Lombard period, but was partially reconstructed in the Renaissance era and continued to be of military importance down to the Napoleonic era and World War II. As the SS 3 (Strada Statale 3) it remains one of the principal highways from Rome to the Adriatic coast.

Ancient route
The Via Flaminia starts at Porta del Popolo in the Aurelian Walls of Rome: Via del Corso (Via Lata), which connects the Campidoglio to the gate, can be considered the urban stretch of the Via Flaminia. The road then runs due north, considerable remains of its pavement being extant under the modern road, passing slightly east of the site of the Etruscan Falerii (Civita Castellana), crossing the Tiber into Umbria over a bridge some slight vestiges of which can still be seen, the "Pile d' Augusto". From there it made its way to Ocriculum (Otricoli) and Narnia (Narni), where it crossed the Nera River by the Ponte d'Augusto, the largest Roman bridge ever built, a splendid four-arched structure to which Martial alludes, one arch of which is still standing. It went on, followed at first by the modern road to Casuentum (San Gemini) which passes over two finely preserved ancient bridges, through Carsulae to the Vicus Martis Tudertium (near modern Massa Martana), then Mevania (Bevagna), and thence to Forum Flaminii (S. Giovanni Profiamma). Later, a more circuitous route from Narnia to Forum Flaminii was adopted, increasing the distance by 12 Roman miles (18 km) and passing by Interamna Nahars (Terni), Spoletium (Spoleto) and Fulginium (Foligno) from which a branch diverged to Perusia (Perugia).

From Forum Flaminii, where the two branches rejoined, the Flaminia went on to Nuceria Camellaria (Nocera Umbra)  whence a branch road ran to Septempeda and thence either to Ancona or to Tolentinum (Tolentino) and Urbs Salvia (Urbisaglia) and Helvillum (site uncertain, probably Sigillo, but maybe Fossato di Vico), to cross the main ridge of the Apennines, a temple of Jupiter Apenninus standing at or near the summit of the pass according to one ancient author. From there it descended to Cales (Cagli), where it turned north-east following the gorges of the Burano.

The narrowest pass was crossed by means of a tunnel chiseled out of solid rock: a first tunnel apparently of the 3rd century BC was replaced by an adjacent tunnel by Vespasian. This is the modern Gola del Furlo, the ancient name of which, Intercisa, means "cut through" with reference to these tunnels. The modern 2‑lane road, the SS 3 Flaminia, still uses Vespasian's tunnel, the emperor's dedicatory inscription still in place; remnants of the earlier tunnel can also be seen.

The Flaminia emerged from the gorges of the Apennines at Forum Sempronii (Fossombrone) and reached the coast of the Adriatic at Fanum Fortunae (Fano). Thence, it ran north-west through Pisaurum (Pesaro) to Ariminum (Rimini). The total distance from Rome was 210 Roman miles,  by the older road and 222 Roman miles,  by the newer. The road gave its name to a juridical district of Italy from the 2nd century onwards, the former territory of the Senones, which was at first associated with Umbria (with which indeed under Augustus it had formed the sixth region of Italy called Umbria et Ager Gallicus), but which after Constantine was always administered with Picenum.

Via Flaminia minor 

The  (Via Flaminia Militare) was a more western route, constructed by Gaius Flaminius (son of the former Gaius Flaminius) in 187 BC from Bononia (Bologna) to Arretium (Arezzo). It gradually fell into disuse, and disappeared after the Middle Ages. Its exact route is unknown although in 1977 Franco Santi and Cesare Agostini claimed to have found remnants, as yet unconfirmed.

Remains

Extant remains of the road consist of rare patches of pavement (by far the largest is an intermittent stretch about 800 meters long at Rignano Flaminio in the northern Lazio), but for the most part of bridges, listed here in order from Rome:

From Rome to Narni:
the Milvian Bridge (Ponte Milvio)
the Pile di Augusto
Ponte Sanguinaro S of Narni
the great bridge at Narni
Along the western branch:
Ponte Caldaro, damaged in World War II
Ponte Calamone both before Sangemini
Ponte Fonnaia near Acquasparta
a bridge just outside Acquasparta, on which was built the church of S. Giovanni de Butris
Ponte del Diavolo at Cavallara near Bastardo
Along the eastern branch:
Ponte Sanguinaro in Spoleto
scant remains of a bridge at Pontebari

After the branches rejoin at S. Giovanni Profiamma:
bridge-like structure at Pieve Fanonica
Le Spugne near Nocera Umbra
three bridges in the comune of Fossato di Vico (one of which, however, belongs properly to a branch road off the main trunk of the Flaminia)
Ponte Spiano in Costacciaro
an imposing bridge at Villa Scirca, blown up in World War II
five bridges in the comune of Cantiano, near Pontedazzo and Pontericcioli
Ponte Mallio (or Manlio) at Cagli, which appears to be partly of pre-Roman (Umbrian) construction
Tunnel at Furlo Pass

Other notable Roman vestiges along the road, aside from those within the individual towns, include a pair of tower tombs between Bevagna and Foligno; and along the eastern branch of the Flaminia in particular, in the area between Spoleto and Trevi, many small Romanesque churches, partly built of reused Roman stone (spolia) — including a few inscriptions — mark the straight line of the road quite clearly.  A small stretch of the road remains in the ruins of Carsulae where it passes through the impressive Arco di Traiano.

Sport
The road was used as part of the individual road race cycling event for the 1960 Summer Olympics in Rome.

In Rome it runs past and gives its name to the Stadio Flaminio sports stadium.

See also
Roman road
Roman bridge
Roman engineering
Via del Corso
Piazza del Popolo

References

External links

1960 Summer Olympics official report. Volume 1. p. 84.
1960 Summer Olympics official report. Volume 2, Part 1. p. 319.
The Via Flaminia at LacusCurtius
Omnes Viae: Via Flaminia on the Peutinger Map

Venues of the 1960 Summer Olympics
History of Lazio
History of Umbria
History of le Marche
Flaminia, Via
Transport in Lazio
Transport in Umbria
Transport in le Marche
Transport in Emilia-Romagna
Olympic cycling venues
Rome Q. I Flaminio
Rome Q. II Parioli
Rome Q. III Pinciano
Rome Q. XVIII Tor di Quinto